Bothrops cotiara is a species of venomous snake in the  family Viperidae. It is endemic to Brazil and Argentina.

Etymology
The specific name, cotiara, is taken from one of its common names.

Common names
Boicoatiara, boicotiara, boiquatiara, coatiara, jararaca-de-barriga-preta, jararaca-preta, and quatiara.

Geographic range
It is found in Argentina in Misiones Province; and in Brazil in the states of Paraná, Rio Grande do Sul, Santa Catarina, and São Paulo.

The type locality is "Núcleo Colonial Cruz Machado, [município de] Marechal Mallet, Estado do Paraná, Brasil".

References

Further reading
 Gomes, J.F. 1913. Uma nova cobra venenosa do Brasil. Annaes Paulistas de Medicina e Cirurgia 1: 65–67. (Lachesis cotiara)

cotiara
Endemic fauna of Argentina
Reptiles described in 1913